Charles Douglas Blex (born December 19, 1946) is an American politician. He has served as a Republican member for the 12th district in the Kansas House of Representatives since 2017.

References

1946 births
Living people
Republican Party members of the Kansas House of Representatives
21st-century American politicians
People from Montgomery County, Kansas
Kansas State University alumni